Alfred Thomas (born 1895) was an English footballer who played as an outside right.

Career
Born in Hetton-le-Hole, Thomas spent his early career with Llanelli and Houghton Main Colliery. He joined Bradford City in November 1921, making 14 league appearances for the club, before moving to Merthyr Town in February 1923. He later played for Hull City, South Shields, Ashington and Hetton United.

Sources

References

1895 births
Date of death missing
English footballers
Llanelli Town A.F.C. players
Darfield F.C. players
Bradford City A.F.C. players
Merthyr Town F.C. players
Hull City A.F.C. players
Gateshead A.F.C. players
Ashington A.F.C. players
English Football League players
Association football outside forwards